Bhaudaha may refer to:

Bhaudaha, Kosi, Nepal
Bhaudaha, Narayani, Nepal